The year 532 BC was a year of the pre-Julian Roman calendar. In the Roman Empire, it was known as year 222  Ab urbe condita. The denomination 532 BC for this year has been used since the early medieval period, when the Anno Domini calendar era became the prevalent method in Europe for naming years.

Events

By place

Europe 
 Pythagoras arrives in the Greek colony of Croton (modern-day Crotone) in Magna Graecia and founds the philosophical school of Pythagoreanism (approximate date).

Births

Deaths
Ping,  ruler (duke) of the State of Jin (from 557 to 532 BC)

References